Sarah Ward (1726-1771), was a Scottish stage actor and theatre manager. She was the first woman to have been active as a theatre manager in Edinburgh.

She was born to the English actor Thomas Achurch and married actor and playwright Henry Ward. the couple was active in Thomas Este's Taylor Halls Company in Edinburgh in 1745. When the company split in two theater companies, one was led by Sara Ward, and opened at the Canongate Theatre in Edinburgh in 1747.
In 1748, she debuted in London, and then toured England and Scotland in various companies, often returning to Edinburgh. Between 1755 and 1758, she was permanently active in Edinburgh Theatre with her lover West Digges, and was a celebrated artist in Scotland: her most popular role was reportedly that of Lady Barnet in John Home's Douglas. In 1758, she left Scotland, and after one season in Dublin, she was active at the Covent Garden theater in London.

Selected roles
 Valeria in The Roman Father by William Whitehead (1750)
 Lady Autumn in The Sister by Charlotte Lennox (1769)

References

 Elizabeth Ewan, Sue Innes & Sian Reynolds: The Biographical Dictionary of Scottish Women: From the Earliest Times to 2004

1771 deaths
18th-century British actresses
18th-century Scottish actresses
1726 births
18th-century theatre managers
18th-century British businesswomen